Santu Singh (born 18 September 1995) is an Indian professional footballer who plays as a defender for Kidderpore in the CFL Premier Division A.

References

1995 births
Living people
Indian footballers
Association football defenders
Gokulam Kerala FC players